Krantikari Morcha ('Revolutionary Front') was political coalition in the Indian state of Uttar Pradesh. It was launched by Mulayam Singh Yadav in 1987, as Yadav led a split in the Lok Dal. Mulayam's Lok Dal faction managed to get the Communist Party of India, the Communist Party of India (Marxist), Chandra Shekar's Janata Party, the Janwadi Party and Maneka Gandhi's Sanjay Vichar Manch.

References

Defunct political parties in Uttar Pradesh
Political schisms
1987 establishments in Uttar Pradesh
Political parties established in 1987